Qalehchi, also rendered as Qalachi, may refer to:
 Qalehchi, Chaharmahal and Bakhtiari
 Qalehchi-ye Bala, Markazi Province
 Qalehchi-ye Pain, Markazi Province
 Qalachi, alternate name of Kalleh-ye Nahr Mian, Markazi Province

See also
Qalehcheh (disambiguation)